Amber Smith may refer to:
Amber M. Smith, American scientist, Memphis, TN
Amber Smith (born 1971), American actress
Amber Smith (band), an indie-rock band from Budapest, Hungary
Amber Smith (album), the fifth studio album of the eponymous band